The Warrior and the Slave Girl is a 1958 Italian-Spanish-French  adventure film in Supercinescope and Eastman Color directed by Vittorio Cottafavi.

Premise 
A cruel Armenian princess craves the throne of the young king Osroé, while a popular uprising led by Asclepius breaks out.

Cast 

 Ettore Manni as Marcus Numidius
 Gianna Maria Canale as  Amira 
 Mara Cruz as  Zahar 
 Georges Marchal as  Asclepius
 Rafael Calvo as  Lucano 
 Fidel Martín as  Osroé 
 Jesús Tordesillas as  Governor Crisipius
 Rafael Durán as Burkala
 Nando Tamberlani as  Senator Lucilius
 Valeria Moriconi as   Servant

References

External links

1958 films
1958 adventure films
Peplum films
Spanish historical adventure films
French historical adventure films
Films directed by Vittorio Cottafavi
Films set in the Roman Empire
Films set in the 2nd century
Films set in ancient Persia
Films about gladiatorial combat
Italian adventure films
Columbia Pictures films
Sword and sandal films
1960s Italian films
1950s Italian films